The Archdiocese of Utrecht is an archdiocese of the Catholic Church in the Netherlands. The Archbishop of Utrecht is the Metropolitan of the Ecclesiastical province of Utrecht. There are six suffragan dioceses in the province: Breda, Groningen-Leeuwarden, Haarlem-Amsterdam, Roermond, Rotterdam, and 's-Hertogenbosch. The cathedral church of the archdiocese is Saint Catherine Cathedral which replaced the prior cathedral, Saint Martin Cathedral, after it was taken by Protestants in the Reformation.

History
In the Middle Ages, the bishops of Utrecht were also prince-bishops of the Holy Roman Empire. The diocese, founded in 695, was suppressed after 1580 owing to the rise of Protestantism.

The Dutch Mission in various forms took care of the spiritual needs of Catholics in the former diocese of Utrecht until the modern archdiocese was established in 1853.

List of Archbishops from 1853

Ordinaries

Johannes Zwijsen                  (1853–1868)
Andreas Ignatius Schaepman        (1868–1882)
Petrus Matthias Snickers          (1883–1895)
Henricus van de Wetering          (1895–1929)
Johannes Henricus Gerardus Jansen (1930–1936)
Johannes de Jong                  (1936–1955)
Bernardus Johannes Alfrink        (1955–1975)
Johannes Gerardus Maria Willebrands (1975–1983)
Adrianus Johannes Simonis (1983–2007)
Willem Jacobus Eijk (since 2007)

Auxiliary bishops
Goswin Haex van Loenhout, O. Carm. (15 May 1469 - 31 Mar 1475)
Godefridus Yerwerd, O.S.B. (28 Mar 1476 - Jan 1483)
Bonaventura Engelbertz van Oldenzeel, O.F.M. (30 Oct 1538 - 1539)
Nicolas Van Nienlant (6 Jul 1541 - 10 Mar 1561), appointed Bishop of Haarlem; also known as Nicolaas Van Nieuwland
Theodorus Gerardus Antonius Hendriksen (21 Jan 1961 - 9 Sep 1969)
Johannes Bernardus Niënhaus (15 Jan 1982 - 1 Sep 1999)
Johannes Antonius de Kok, O.F.M. (15 Jan 1982 - 27 Aug 2005)
Gerard Johannes Nicolaus de Korte (11 Apr 2001 - 18 Jun 2008), appointed Bishop of Groningen-Leeuwarden
Theodorus Cornelis Maria Hoogenboom 7 Dec 2009 -)
Herman Willebrordus Woorts (7 Dec 2009 -)

See also
Timeline of Utrecht
History of religion in the Netherlands
Roman Catholicism in the Netherlands
Religion in Belgium
Religion in the Netherlands

References

External links
 GCatholic.org information

 
Utrecht
Culture of Flevoland
Culture of Gelderland
Culture of Overijssel
Culture of Utrecht (province)
Organisations based in Utrecht (city)
Dronten
Lelystad